Lithocarpus confertus is a tree in the beech family Fagaceae. The specific epithet  is from the Latin meaning "crowded", referring to the inflorescences and infructescences.

Description
The greyish brown bark is scaly or lenticellate.

Distribution and habitat
Lithocarpus confertus is endemic to Borneo.

References

confertus
Endemic flora of Borneo
Trees of Borneo
Plants described in 1970
Flora of the Borneo lowland rain forests
Flora of the Borneo montane rain forests